Ahmed Aly Elsayed (born 1980) is an American snooker player and six time winner of the United States National Snooker Championship. He will turn professional at the start of the 2023/2024 season. He earned a two-year tour card after winning the men's PABSA Pan American Championship in October 2022.

Aly took part in the World Seniors Championship 2022, Sheffield, England. He was knocked out in the first round by England's Wayne Cooper.

Aly also played the part of a snooker player at the Samuel J. Friedman Theatre, Broadway in the play The Nap in 2018. It was written by One Man, Two Guvnors playwright, Richard Bean.

Career finals

Amateur finals: 10 (7 titles)

References

1980 births
Living people
American snooker players
20th-century American people
21st-century American people